Favio César Márquez (born 30 January 1974 in Morón (Buenos Aires), Argentina) is an Argentine former professional footballer who played as a forward for clubs of Argentina, Chile and Portugal.

Clubs
 Boca Juniors 1995–1996
 Santiago Wanderers 1999
 Académico de Viseu 2000
 Provincial Osorno 2000–2001

References
 
 

1974 births
Living people
Argentine footballers
Association football forwards
Boca Juniors footballers
Santiago Wanderers footballers
Provincial Osorno footballers
Académico de Viseu F.C. players
Primera B de Chile players
Chilean Primera División players
Argentine Primera División players
Argentine expatriate footballers
Argentine expatriate sportspeople in Chile
Expatriate footballers in Chile
Argentine expatriate sportspeople in Portugal
Expatriate footballers in Portugal
People from Morón Partido
Sportspeople from Buenos Aires Province